Nelson Bernard Simmons (born June 27, 1963) is an American former professional baseball outfielder. He attended James Madison High School. He played during three seasons at the Major League Baseball (MLB) for the Detroit Tigers and Baltimore Orioles.

Career
Simmons was drafted by the Tigers in the 2nd round of the 1981 MLB draft. Simmons played his first professional season with their Rookie league Bristol Tigers in 1981, and his last with the Pittsburgh Pirates' Triple-A Calgary Cannons in 1995.

In a 3 year, 100 game MLB career, Simmons posted a .261 batting average (86-for-330) with 38 runs, 11 home runs and 40 RBIs. He finished his career with a .963 fielding percentage playing left and right field.

References
"Nelson Simmons Statistics". The Baseball Cube. 23 January 2008.
"Nelson Simmons Statistics". Baseball-Reference. 23 January 2008.

External links

1963 births
Living people
African-American baseball players
American expatriate baseball players in Canada
American expatriate baseball players in Mexico
Baltimore Orioles players
Baseball players from Washington, D.C.
Birmingham Barons players
Bristol Tigers players
Broncos de Reynosa players
Cafeteros de Córdoba players
Calgary Cannons players
Charros de Jalisco players
Denver Zephyrs players
Detroit Tigers players
Evansville Triplets players
Ganaderos de Tabasco players
Huntsville Stars players
Lakeland Tigers players
Long Beach Riptide players
Louisville Redbirds players
Major League Baseball left fielders
Major League Baseball right fielders
Mexican League baseball right fielders
Nashville Sounds players
Palm Springs Angels players
Palm Springs Suns players
Rieleros de Aguascalientes players
Rochester Red Wings players
Saraperos de Saltillo players
Tacoma Tigers players
Tri-City Posse players
21st-century African-American people
20th-century African-American sportspeople